Daniel Newton may refer to:

 Daniel Newton (rugby union) (born 1989), Welsh rugby union footballer
 Daniel Newton (cricketer) (born 1990), English cricketer
 Danny Newton (born 1991), English footballer